Malumz on Decks is a house music DJ and producer duo originating from South Africa, consisting of Oscar Nyathi and Mandla Mtshali. Their name "Malumz" when translated from Zulu, means "Uncles".

History
Malumz on Decks music group members are originally from Ekurhuleni, east of Johannesburg. Before they became a duo, the Kempton Park residents were on separate paths with different names. Mtshali, also known as Mandla the DJ, was in partnership with Noxious Deejay, who was a solo music producer at the time, while Nyathi was a promoter who later became a DJ. The duo often spent time together before they eventually became friends and supported each other during their respective gigs.

In 2017, they released their debut album The journey. A year later they released their single, "Shay’ Number" which became the most played song on South African radio stations.

In June 2019, they released the album Find Your Way which featured singers KB Motsilanyane on the single "Taba tsa ha" and Moneoa on the single "I’m Moving On". In that same year, To further expand the duo's vision in 2020 they partnered up with Roro Morudi and relaunched Jubilee Vibes, a shisa nyama in Kempton Park. The duo has also received recognition and nominations for their songs. Later that year, they were nominated for Record of the Year at the 2019 South African Music Awards. The album, Find Your Way which brought them the SAMA Song of the year nominated single "Shayi’Number", was further recognised by gaining three more SAMA nominations at the 2020 South African Music Awards. The duo is also signed as resident DJs on Metro FM's Urban Beat.

In October 2020, their third album Afro Is Africa. The album featured collaborations from local musicians SoulStar, Eltonnick, Lizwi, Bontle Smith, Tabia, Lizwi, Khanyisa and DOT.

Musical style
They create house music containing elements of afro house and Deep house, combining live instruments such as bass, keyboards, percussions, flute, and vocals with samplers, effects and synths.
Explaining their musical style:
Different songs give us different feelings and it's almost as if we can feel the energy or potential to get people on the dance floor, as well as visualise how people will move to the music. A lot of music moves us emotionally, whether it makes us sad, happy, hyper, energetic or relaxed. We find music to be extremely powerful.

Members
 Oscar Nyathi – basslines, kicks, vocals, percussions
 Mandla Mtshali – melodies, chords, drums, piano

Awards and nominations

Discography
 The Journey (2017)
 Find Your Way (2019)
 Afro Is Africa (2020)

References

External links
 

South African musicians
South African DJs